Childish Games (also known as Dictation) is a 2012 Spanish horror film written and directed by Antonio Chavarrías which stars Juan Diego Botto, Bárbara Lennie and Mágica Pérez. The film competed at the 62nd Berlin International Film Festival in February 2012. It is an Oberon Cinematográfica production.

Cast

See also 
 List of Spanish films of 2012

References

External links
 

2012 films
2012 horror films
2010s Spanish-language films
Spanish horror thriller films
Films scored by Zacarías M. de la Riva
2010s Spanish films